Nicklas Nygaard Svendsen (born 11 December 1986) is a Danish former professional footballer who played as a left-back. He currently works as executive assistant for the director of football at Danish Superliga club Brøndby IF.

During his active career as a player, he gained 35 caps for various Denmark national youth teams.

Club career 
Svendsen progressed through the KB academy in his youth years, after coming from B.93 in 2005. On 2 August 2007, he signed a two-year contract with Dutch club RKC Waalwijk, after having trialled with Emmen. There, he was set to replace the injured Guus de Vries. He made his debut for the club – which was also his professional debut – on 10 August in a 2–2 draw against FC Omniworld. He would, however, struggle with injuries after a relatively successful first season with RKC, and saw diminished playing time in his second season at the club. He made a total of 17 league appearances for the club.

After one-and-a-half year, Svendsen returned to Denmark on 2 February 2009, where he signed a two-year contract with Boldklubben Frem. He spent six months with the club in the second-tier 1st Division, before moving on to HB Køge, where he also penned a two-year deal. On 20 September 2009 in a home match against OB, Svendsen scored two own goals – a league record. He also committed a penalty during the match. He left Køge after one season, after he was deemed superfluous by head coach Aurelijus Skarbalius. One month later, on 25 September 2010, he signed with Brønshøj Boldklub, where he signed until the end of the year. He signed a six-month contract extension when the deal ran out in December 2010. At the end of the season, Svendsen left the club for Fremad Amager, competing in the third-tier 2nd Division. He also played there for one season, before leaving as a free agent in July 2012.

International career 
Svendsen has gained 35 caps for various Denmark national youth teams, including 19 appearances for the under-17 team and 11 games for the under-19 team.

Post-retirement 
Svendsen retired from football as part of AB Tårnby, and later worked as assistant coach for Tårnby FF. In March 2018, he was appointed executive assistant for the sporting director at Brøndby IF, assisting first Troels Bech, and since Ebbe Sand and Carsten V. Jensen.

References

External links
 Official Danish Superliga Statistics

1986 births
Living people
Danish men's footballers
Association football defenders
RKC Waalwijk players
Boldklubben Frem players
HB Køge players
Brønshøj Boldklub players
Fremad Amager players
AB Tårnby players
Eerste Divisie players
Danish 1st Division players
Danish expatriate men's footballers
Expatriate footballers in the Netherlands
Danish expatriate sportspeople in the Netherlands
Denmark youth international footballers
Danish 2nd Division players
Boldklubben af 1893 players
Kjøbenhavns Boldklub players
Footballers from Copenhagen